Mira is a municipality in the central Portuguese district of Coimbra.

History

In 1442, the regent Peter, Duke of Coimbra, conceded administrative autonomy to the town of Mira.

Concession of its first Foral (charter) occurred almost a century later, during the reign of King D. Manuel I. At that time, on 28 August 1514, the king bestowed to Gonçalo Tavares, the first seigneur of Mira, privileges to develop the region.

In 1644, by royal concession, King D. John IV of Portugal transfer donatário title to the Casa da Rainha referring to the older concession, bestowed further rights to his successor, Manuel de Sousa Tavares (from the 1758 Memórias Paroquiais).

Mira was integrated in to the bishopric and comarca of Coimbra in 1758.

Geography
Administratively, the municipality is divided into 4 civil parishes (freguesias):
 Mira
 Praia de Mira
 Seixo
 Carapelhos

Economy
A centre for artisanal fishery, and aquaculture, Mira's economic activities also rely on agriculture, forestry and tourism.

In 2007, the Galician fishing company Pescanova, headquartered in Redondela, Spain, announced its intention to build several sea bass aquaculture plants in Mira. Pescanova invested about 350 million Euros in the Portuguese aquaculture plant, which was backed by the Portuguese government with about 45 million Euros in incentives. The plants incorporate wind farms to alleviate the high energy costs, as well as a fish feeding plant. The plants were projected to reach a production rate of between 30,000 and 100,000 tonnes per year.

Architecture

Civic
 Building of the Post, Telegraph and Telephones (CTT) of Mira
 Fountain of São Bento
 Municipal Council and Judicial Courthouse of Mira
 Pillory of Mira
 Subregional Hospital of Mira

Religious
 Chapel of Leitões
 Chapel of Nossa do Carmo
 Chapel of Nossa Senhora da Conceição
 Chapel of Santa Marinha
 Chapel of São Sebastião
 Church of São Tomé
 Church of Nossa Senhora do Carmo
 Hermitage of Santa Maria de Mira

Notable people 
 Isabel Capeloa Gil (born 1965 in Mira) the 6th Rector of the Catholic University of Portugal

References

External links
 
 Photos from Mira

Towns in Portugal
Seaside resorts in Portugal
Populated places in Coimbra District
Municipalities of Coimbra District